Oskar Kallis (Tallinn, November 23, 1892 – Yalta, 1 January 1918) was an Estonian artist, one of the main representatives of the Estonian national romanticism.

Kallas studied in 1907 and 1913 to 1916 in the studio of the artist Ants Laikmaa, and in 1912-1913 studied design at the Estonian Artist Society (Eesti Kunstiselts). He participated in 1917 in the establishment of the artistic association Vikerla. He was particularly influenced by the Finnish painter Akseli Gallen-Kallela, he devoted himself especially in his short career to the illustration of the Estonian national epic Kalevipoeg, creating about 40 works. He also designed ethnographically styled furniture and textiles. He died of tuberculosis in the Crimea in 1918.

Selected works
 "Lennuk" (1914)
 "Sulevipoja kalm" (1914)
 "Kalevipoeg kasvatab tamme" (1914/1915)
 "Kalevipoeg kellukest helistamas" (1914/1915),
 "Kalevipoeg allmaailmas" (1915)
 "Manala uks" (1915)

Selected paintings

External links
Works by Oskar Kallis at the Art Museum of Estonia

References

Mai Levin, Maire Toom: Oskar Kallis 1892–1917. Tallinn 1992

1892 births
1918 deaths
Artists from Tallinn
People from the Governorate of Estonia
20th-century Estonian painters
20th-century Estonian male artists
20th-century deaths from tuberculosis
Tuberculosis deaths in Estonia
Artists from the Russian Empire